Eunoe uniseriata is a scale worm described from Puget Sound in Washington (state) in the US at a depths of about 70–200m.

Description
Number of segments 38; elytra 15 pairs. No distinct pigmentation pattern. Prostomium anterior margin comprising a pair of acute anterior projections. Lateral antennae inserted ventrally (beneath Prostomium and median antenna). elytra marginal fringe of papillae present. Notochaetae distinctly thicker than neurochaetae. Bidentate neurochaetae absent.

References

Phyllodocida
Animals described in 1968